Desire is the second solo studio album by English singer Toyah Willcox, released in 1987 by E.G. Records.

Background
Musically, Desire is more typical of Willcox's band's earlier albums rather than its more commercial predecessor Minx. Most of the songs are once again co-written by Willcox, and while the original release of the album does not feature any musician credits, it features a consistent band line-up, rather than the large number of session musicians involved in Minx. Robert Fripp and Ronnie Wood play on the album but are uncredited. The album features two cover versions: "Echo Beach", originally recorded by Martha and the Muffins, and "Love's Unkind", originally by Donna Summer. Willcox stated that she was forced to record "Love's Unkind" by her record label, even though she was fiercely opposed to it. E.G. Records threatened to cancel the album's release if she did not. The cover photos were taken by Carrie Branovan.

The lead single, "Echo Beach", became a minor hit in the UK. The second and final single was "Moonlight Dancing", a song about an idea that "the moon is a connection that puts us all together", which contains lyrics from a re-recorded version of "Dawn Chorus". The single failed to chart. The album itself was not a commercial success either and did not enter the album sales chart in the UK. Desire was reissued digitally in 2015.

Track listing
Side one
 "Echo Beach" (Mark Gane) – 3:23
 "Moonlight Dancing" (Toyah Willcox, Joel Bogen, Nick Graham) – 4:13
 "Revive the World" (Willcox, Tony Geballe) – 3:28
 "The View" (Willcox, Adrian Lee) – 3:45
 "Moon Migration" (Willcox, Bruce Woolley) – 5:37

Side two
"Love's Unkind" (Donna Summer, Giorgio Moroder, Pete Bellotte) – 3:11
 "Dear Diary" (Willcox, Simon Darlow) – 4:03
 "Deadly as a Woman" (Willcox, Graham) – 4:00
 "Goodbye Baby" (Willcox, Graham, Darlow) – 3:37
 "When a Woman Cries" (Willcox) – 4:31
 "Desire" (Willcox, Robert Fripp) – 4:04

Digital edition bonus tracks
"Echo Beach" (Surf Mix) (Gane) – 5:42
 "Plenty" (Willcox) – 3:44
 "Sun Up" (Willcox) – 2:56
 "Re-Entry into Dance" (Willcox, Geballe) – 4:25
 "Mesmerised" (Willcox, Graham) – 4:08

Personnel
 Toyah Willcox – vocals 
 Robert Fripp – guitar (uncredited)
 Ronnie Wood – guitar on track 7 (uncredited)

Production
 Mike Hedges – producer, mixing
 Haydn Bendall – engineer, mixing
 The Quick – mixing on track 1
 John Porter – mixing on track 6
 Carrie Branovan – photography
 Ken O'Rourke – hair stylist

References

External links
 Official audio stream on YouTube
 The official Toyah website

1987 albums
Toyah Willcox albums
Albums produced by Mike Hedges
E.G. Records albums